Terril Davis (born April 21, 1968) is a retired male middle distance runner from the United States, who specialized in the 800-meter run. He competed in the 1980s and the early 1990s for his native country. He set his personal best in the men's 800 metres event (1:44.44) on 1992-06-24 at the US National Championships in New Orleans.

Competition record

References

Profile

1968 births
Living people
American male middle-distance runners
Athletes (track and field) at the 1991 Pan American Games
Athletes (track and field) at the 1995 Pan American Games
Pan American Games medalists in athletics (track and field)
Pan American Games silver medalists for the United States
Medalists at the 1991 Pan American Games